Ángelo Alfonso Padilla Barahona (born 5 March 1990) is a Guatemalan footballer who plays for Carmelita as a striker, in Costa Rica's First Division.

International career
Padilla appeared for the Guatemala national football team in two 2014 FIFA World Cup qualifiers.

International goals
Scores and results list. Guatemala's goal tally first.

References

External links

1990 births
Living people
Association football forwards
Guatemalan footballers
Guatemala international footballers
Universidad de San Carlos players
C.D. Suchitepéquez players
Puntarenas F.C. players
C.S.D. Municipal players
A.D. Carmelita footballers
Guatemalan expatriate footballers
Expatriate footballers in Costa Rica